Asterotrichion is a genus of flowering plants belonging to the family Malvaceae.

Its native range is Tasmania.

Species:

Asterotrichion discolor

References

Malvaceae
Malvaceae genera